Vasilios Vitlis (born 28 October 1993) is a Greek professional footballer who plays as a left-back for Super League 2 club Iraklis.

References

1993 births
Living people
Greek footballers
Delta Ethniki players
Gamma Ethniki players
Football League (Greece) players
Super League Greece players
Super League Greece 2 players
Kavala F.C. players
Panserraikos F.C. players
Doxa Drama F.C. players
Iraklis Thessaloniki F.C. players
Apollon Smyrnis F.C. players
Association football defenders
Footballers from Thessaloniki